Tetracha cribrata is a species of tiger beetle that was described by Steinheil in 1875. The species can be found in Meta and Cundinamarca of Colombia, as well as in Apure, Yaracui, and Carabobo of Venezuela.

References

Cicindelidae
Beetles described in 1875
Beetles of South America